Hélène Landemore is Professor of Political Science at Yale University. She has a PhD from Harvard University. Her subfield is political theory and she is known for her works on democratic theory.

Biography 
After a childhood spent in Normandy, Landemore began higher studies in Paris at the age of 18. She joined the École Normale and Sciences Po Paris. In 2008 she received a Ph.D. from Harvard University with a thesis on the idea of collective intelligence applied to the justification of democracy.

Public life 
She researched the 2010 participatory constituent process in Iceland and directly observed the 2019-20 French’s Citizen Convention for Climate. In September 2022 she was appointed to the governance committee of the French Citizens' Convention on end of life. She regularly presents her ideas and proposals in French and American newspapers.

Theories 
Hélène Landemore’s research focuses on deliberative democracy and collective intelligence.

Criticism of electoral democracy 
Like David Van Reybrouck and Brett Hennig, she observes that elections are more aristocratic than democratic, as they empower a tiny social elite. Elected parliaments are never representative of the entire population. In particular, women, working-class people, and social minorities are systematically underrepresented.

Money provided by rich donors to political campaigns have an important impact on electoral politics, particularly in the United States of America. As a result, the United States more closely resembles a plutocracy, in which the economic elite has more influence on politics than the vast majority of the population.

Sortition and Citizen’s Assembly 
Hélène Landemore sees a new institution as the "key" to a new form of democracy. She calls it the "open mini-public". It is a citizen’s assembly of a few hundreds of people chosen by lot.

Cognitive Diversity 
The diversity of the members of an assembly is a strength for deliberation. Reflection will be more rich and nuanced if it involves different perspectives, life experiences, and knowledge. That is why an assembly chosen by lot is generally preferable to an assembly of experts. We cannot predict in advance what knowledge and experiences will be useful to face a political problem. Reason then commands that we choose maximum diversity over the specialized ability.

It is an epistemic and probabilist argument in favour of democratic inclusion and sortition.

"Open Democracy" 
Hélène Landemore proposes a new paradigm, "Open Democracy," which rests on five principles:

 Participation rights: the rights of expression and association, to which are added the rights of petition and citizen’s initiative. It shall enable the convocation of a referendum on a law voted by the Parliament. 
 Deliberation: the decisions must come from discussion between equal citizens. The floor must not be monopolized by few gifted orators. 
 Majoritarian principle: instead of super-majorities rules, which produce blocking minorities. The vote must integrate new and fairer methods, such as the Majority Judgment. 
 Democratic representation: thanks to sortition and, to a lesser extent, voluntary participation. 
 Transparency: of the process and of the results of the deliberations, in real-time or afterwards. Transparency is a means of control, which requires that information be made public and legible to citizens.

Works

Books in English 
Hélène Landemore, Jon Elster et al. Edited volume: Collective Wisdom: Principles and Mechanisms, Cambridge, Cambridge University Press, 2012.

Hélène Landemore, Democratic reason: Politics, collective intelligence, and the rule of the many, Princeton, Princeton University Press, 2017.

Hélène Landemore, Open Democracy: Reinventing Popular Rule for the Twenty-First Century, Princeton, Princeton University Press, 2020.

Hélène Landemore, Jason Brennan. Debating Democracy: Do We Need More or Less?, Oxford University Press, 2021.

Lucy Bernholz, Hélène Landemore, and Rob Reich. Edited volume: Digital Technology and Democratic Theory, Chicago, Chicago University Press, 2021.

Books in French 
Hélène Landemore, Hume. Probabilité et choix raisonnable, Paris, PUF, 2004.

References

External links 

French political scientists
Yale University faculty
Harvard University alumni
Living people
1976 births
Women political scientists